Orlice is a river in the Czech Republic. It is tributary of the Elbe river, which it enters in the city of Hradec Králové. Its main tributaries are Divoká Orlice and Tichá Orlice. Part of the Divoká Orlice acts as the international boundary between the Czech Republic and Poland. It is 32.5 km long, and its basin area is about 2,040 km2, of which 1,965 km2 in the Czech Republic.

References

Rivers of the Hradec Králové Region